Flying Ace Aerial Chase is a Suspended Family Coaster designed and built by Vekoma. The roller coaster debuted at Kings Island in 2001 and was followed by another identical installation that launched at Carowinds in 2003. Originally, both rides opened as Rugrats Runaway Reptar, themed to the Nickelodeon animated television series Rugrats and its two-part episode "Runaway Reptar". Following Cedar Fair's acquisition of both parks in 2006, both were eventually re-themed to the Snoopy vs. the Red Baron comic strip series in the 1960s by  Peanuts creator Charles Schulz, undergoing a name change in the process. The Carowinds installation was renamed Kiddy Hawk for the 2018 season.

History

Kings Island
Flying Ace Aerial Chase opened to the public on April 7, 2001 as Rugrats Runaway Reptar. This was Kings Island's fourth kids' coaster earning the park the title: "Kid's Coaster Capital of the World!". That same year, the Kings Mills Log Flume was refurbished and rethemed to Nickelodeon and was named The Wild Thornberry's River Adventure. Those two new rides formed a new area called Nickelodeon Central. This area was separate from the regular Hanna-Barbera children's area, but it was still a kids' area. It was not until 2006 that the rest of the Hanna-Barbera land was transformed into one kids' area, called Nickelodeon Universe. This change did not affect the two already existing rides in Nickelodeon Central, since they already had the Nickelodeon theme. In 2010, Nickelodeon Universe became Planet Snoopy, and changed the ride's name to Flying Ace Aerial Chase to fit the Snoopy theme. The support beams of the ride were repainted from green to orange.

Carowinds
When Rugrats Runaway Reptar became so immensely popular at Paramount's Kings Island, the then-owners, Paramount, decided to build a copy of the ride at Carowinds. Rugrats Runaway Reptar opened in 2003 at Paramount's Carowinds as a direct clone as the one found at Kings Island, the only difference being the color of the shoulder restraints. From 2010 through 2017, the ride was named Flying Ace Aerial Chase. For the 2018 transition from Planet Snoopy to Camp Snoopy, the name was changed to Kiddy Hawk, and was re-painted light blue and tan. It was also moved out of the kids area and into Celebration Plaza.

Ride layout
As the train comes out of the station, it makes a 90 degree turn to the right and starts up the tire drive lift hill. As the train exits the lift hill, it is sent on a double helix to the left. From there, the train makes its way under the lift hill and over to the top of the station, making the riders feel as if they could touch it with their feet. Then it turns right and travels alongside of the lift hill and then turns right 180 degrees. At this point the train is very close to the ground. Then, it turns 180 degrees to the left into the activating brakes.

References

External links
 Official Flying Ace Aerial Chase page at Carowinds
 Official Flying Ace Aerial Chase page at Kings Island

Roller coasters in Ohio
Roller coasters in South Carolina
Roller coasters operated by Cedar Fair
Peanuts in amusement parks
Roller coasters introduced in 2001
Roller coasters introduced in 2003